

1990 Final results 

 1990 Progress

1991 Final results 

 1991 Progress

1992 Final results 

 1992 Progress

1993 Final results 

 1993 Progress

1994 Final results  

 1994 Progress
Not sufficient documentation to produce process 1994!

1995 Final results  

 1995 Progress

1996 Final results  

 1996 Progress

1997 Final results  

 1997 Progress

1998 Final results  

 1998 Progress

1999 Final results  

 1999 Progress

Further results
For further results see:
 Soling North American Championship results (1969–79)
 Soling North American Championship results (1980–89)
 Soling North American Championship results (1990–99)
 Soling North American Championship results (2000–09)
 Soling North American Championship results (2010–19)
 Soling North American Championship results (2020–29)

References

Soling North American Championship